KEDP (91.1 FM) is a radio station licensed to Las Vegas, New Mexico, United States. The station is currently owned by the Board of Education of the City of Albuquerque.

On February 6, 2021, KEDP began a collaboration with KANW in Albuquerque. On February 9, an FCC application was filed to transfer the license from  the Board of Regents of New Mexico Highlands University to the Board of Education of the City of Albuquerque. The donation of the station's license was consummated on May 25, 2021.

References

External links

EDP